Vateriopsis seychellarum is a species of plant in the family Dipterocarpaceae, and is the only species in the genus Vateriopsis. It is endemic to Seychelles. It has been labeled as a critically endangered species due to climate change.

References 

Dipterocarpaceae
Trees of Seychelles
Critically endangered plants
Endemic flora of Seychelles
Monotypic Malvales genera
Taxonomy articles created by Polbot